Mount Ruth is an 8,690 ft summit located within Mount Rainier National Park in Pierce County of Washington state. Part of the Cascade Range, Mount Ruth is situated between the Emmons Glacier and the Inter Glacier. Access is via the Glacier Basin Trail. The name of the peak honors Ruth Knapp, daughter of the prospector who built Knapp's Cabin in Glacier Basin below the peak. Precipitation runoff from Mount Ruth drains into the White River.

Climate

Mount Ruth is located in the marine west coast climate zone of western North America. Most weather fronts originate in the Pacific Ocean, and travel northeast toward the Cascade Mountains. As fronts approach, they are forced upward by the peaks of the Cascade Range (Orographic lift), causing them to drop their moisture in the form of rain or snowfall onto the Cascades. As a result, the west side of the Cascades experiences high precipitation, especially during the winter months in the form of snowfall. During winter months, weather is usually cloudy, but, due to high pressure systems over the Pacific Ocean that intensify during summer months, there is often little or no cloud cover during the summer. Because of maritime influence, snow tends to be wet and heavy, resulting in high avalanche danger.

References

External links
 National Park Service web site: Mount Rainier National Park

Ruth
Ruth
Ruth